Enchanted Arms is a 2006 role-playing video game developed by FromSoftware and published by Ubisoft. It was released for the Xbox 360 in 2006 and for the PlayStation 3 in 2007.

Gameplay 
Enchanted Arms features turn-based combat where the player controls four characters when fighting their adversaries. This takes place on grid layouts where both ranged and close combat attacks can be used. Player characters level up as the game progresses and can learn new skills.

Plot

Story 
The story of Enchanted Arms begins as Atsuma studies to become an Enchanter along with his friends Makoto and Toya at Enchanter's University in Yokohama City. When the trio skip class to attend a local festival, an earthquake occurs and the man-made golems in the area become berserk and attack citizens. After returning to university, Atsuma, Toya and Makoto find that things are in chaos, and that the mysterious "sealed ward" had been opened. While seeking to discover what has happened, the group meet up with the Queen of Ice, a Devil Golem sealed long ago. With her immense Ether capability and regeneration power, she overpowers the three. She captures Toya as ice falls on Makoto; as a result, Atsuma fights her by using his right arm that turns into something out of the ordinary that could harm a Devil Golem.

Detained in London City, Atsuma learns that the Queen of Ice had destroyed Yokohama. Escaping with local resident Karin and her bodyguard Raigar, Atsuma discovers that the two are part of a resistance movement that opposes King Caliban's plans to revive the Emperor of Fire, another Devil Golem hidden right under the city. They find that Yokohama is now an icy wasteland. Venturing further in and returning to the university, they encounter Professor Kou, a teacher at the university. He reveals that he was very interested in Atsuma's right arm and started the golem riot to awaken its power, all for the Queen's revival and the restoration of Magic, the greatest technology in existence. Toya, possibly having been mind controlled, is now the Queen's Magicore, the power source and activation device of a Devil Golem. The Queen turns on Kou and destroys his laboratory, killing him.

In London, Atsuma is recruited into the Arsenal, the resistance group and the golem hunter, Yuki, who he encounters in Yokohama before the golem riot, joins him. After an attack from the London Knights, the arsenal suspects Raigar, a former knight and brother of Ooka, leading the attack. The others reveal to everyone that the Leader and his giggling companion are collaborators and give the Emperor of Fire's Magicore to Ooka. Ooka and Baron Hartson conspire to ruin the King's public image and revive the Emperor themselves. Karin reveals that she has no choice but to merge with the Emperor, for those who have ancient blood can activate and control Devil Golems to some extent. The Emperor fights with the Queen in the city before he is killed and consumed by Atsuma's right arm to save her.

Hearing of a secret art taught near Kyoto City, the group leaves London to go there. The Queen orders Lord Tokimune, Shogun of Kyoto, to revive the Lord of Earth and thus, they could not enter the city until tomorrow. They stay in Iwato village and meet Sayaka, Raigar's fiancée. They learn that the secret art is taught by the Ascetic Monk, who lives in the Ascetic Court, which is accessible from the village but Tokimune has the key to get in. Though he refuses an alliance with London City, he allows them the key. Once they get it, Karin is kidnapped by a group of ninjas led by Oboro.

Rescuing Karin, the group confronts Tokimune, who was collecting Ether to revive the Lord of Earth. Despite being warned by Sayaka and Tokimune not to enter the Ascetic Court, Atsuma and the others defeat Sayaka and meet the Ascetic Monk. The group is told to get a portion of the Lord of Earth's core material in order to master the art of "Gaea". Though the group succeeds, the village is attacked by ninja, and confronts Tokimune. As they flee, Tokimune is killed by Oboro who learns the location of the Magicore: inside the Shogun; he is then killed by the Queen of Ice. They fight against the near revived Lord of Earth, but when he transforms into his full form, Atsuma kills him by pulling him into his right arm.

After the Lord of Earth's Magicore is drained of Ether, the group meets up with Sage, Raigar's teacher, who initially declines their offer to help them. The Queen of Ice invites them to her ice castle north of Gravekeep Holm. Atsuma is sent into a mental vision where he retrieves a God orb, which was molded into a weapon for him. Raigar learns from the Sage that Atsuma's parents left him as a child at the base of her tower, so sick that she used the cells of an unknown Devil Golem named Infinity, to save him. She also theorizes how to separate a human Magicore from a Devil Golem; just insert its original one to release the human. Atsuma, Karin, Raigar and Yuki defeat the Queen of Ice and save Toya; the mysterious man the group encounters several times reveals himself as Makoto soon afterwards. However, Atsuma has a vision and the disembodied entity then reveals itself as Infinity, who was ordered to reconstruct all matter in the world to the time of the Era of Magic. When Infinity attempts to possess Atsuma, Toya and Makoto free him from Infinity's control. As Infinity begins to revive, Atsuma remembers the opposite word of Gaea, "Fury", and transforms into his half-golem form, combining everyone's enchanting to defeat Infinity. Yokohama is restored and the population returns as the game ends.

Characters 

Release 
Although the game was intended to be an Xbox 360 launch title for the Japanese market, its release date was pushed back to January 12, 2006, by the developer, From Software. Ubisoft published the game in August 2006 in North America, and in September 2006 in the PAL region. At the time of its PS3 release, it was a launch title for the PAL market. Since its release, it has been confirmed that the game uses only a single DVD, in contrast to earlier multi-disc reports. It also comes with an art book and mini-calendar in Japan. The supplementary content included with the initial American product shipment was a 48-page prequel manga.

Reception 

The game received "mixed or average reviews" on both platforms according to the review aggregation website Metacritic. RPGFan reviewer Patrick Gann extolled the Xbox 360 version's visuals and gameplay, calling it "one of [his] favorite RPGs of the year." In Japan, Famitsu gave the same console version a score of one eight and three sevens for a total of 29 out of 40.

Notes

References

External links 
Official website

2006 video games
FromSoftware games
Multiplayer and single-player video games
PlayStation 3 games
Japanese role-playing video games
Role-playing video games
Science fantasy video games
Ubisoft games
Video games developed in Japan
Xbox 360 games